Terebinthia may refer to:
 Terebinthia, a location in The Chronicles of Narnia; see Narnia (world)#Eastern Ocean
 Terebinthia, a fictional character from Maia (novel)
 The land of the terebinth tree
 Terabithia, a fictional location from the novel Bridge to Terabithia

See also
 Bridge to Terabithia (disambiguation)
 Terebinth